Christ Blessing is a tempera on panel painting by Giovanni Bellini. It is usually dated to the early 1460s, that is, in the middle of Bellini's Mantegnese phase. It is now in the Louvre in Paris.

It is probably the painting mentioned by the historian Carlo Ridolfi as an "Effigy of the Saviour" in the Augustinian monastery of Santo Stefano Church in Venice. Morassi is the only art historian to demur from this consensus, instead identifying the painting seen by Ridolfi with a painting in a Swiss private collection dating to 1500.

References

Paintings by Giovanni Bellini
Paintings in the Louvre by Italian artists
1460s paintings
Books in art
Paintings of Christus Dolens